Saunders Trades and Technical High School (Saunders High School or SHS) is a public high school for grades 9–12, in Yonkers, New York.

Awards and recognition

In October 1994, the Middle States Association of Secondary Schools and Colleges evaluated Saunders to be an exemplary high school, “a model for the nation.” In both 1995 and 1998 Saunders was selected to be a “New York State School of Excellence.” After a rigorous application process and three days visitation, the United States Department of Education recognized Saunders as a “Blue Ribbon School of Excellence.”

Notable alumni
Rich Ranglin, American football player
Dave Costa͵ America football player

References

Public high schools in Yonkers, New York